is a train station in Nishi-ku, Niigata, Niigata Prefecture, Japan, operated by East Japan Railway Company (JR East).

Lines

Station layout
The station consists of one side platform serving a single bi-directional track.

Suica farecard can be used at this station.

History 
The station opened on 1 March 2005.

Surrounding area
Nishi High School

See also
 List of railway stations in Japan

References

External links
 JR East station information 

Railway stations in Niigata (city)
Railway stations in Japan opened in 2005
Stations of East Japan Railway Company
Echigo Line